Doña Teodora Alonzo High School is a high school in Manila, Philippines. 

Educational institutions established in 1961
High schools in Manila
Education in Santa Cruz, Manila
1961 establishments in the Philippines